Corey Small (born March 23, 1987 in St. Catharines, Ontario) is a Canadian lacrosse player who plays for the Buffalo Bandits of the National Lacrosse League and formerly the Hamilton Nationals in Major League Lacrosse.

High school career
Small attended Holy Cross Catholic Secondary School in St. Catharines. During his senior year at Holy Cross, he helped lead the Raiders to a provincial championship.

Canadian Box career

Junior
Small played for the St. Catharines Athletics in the OLA Junior A Lacrosse League from to 2004 to 2008. In 2005, he won the Gaylord Powless Sportsmanship Award. During his 5 years for the Athletics, Small totaled up 127 goals and 278 points in just 102 games. He would also round up 40 goals and 77 points in 30 playoff games.

Senior
Small was selected 2nd overall in the 2009 Major Series Lacrosse draft by the Kitchener-Waterloo Kodiaks, just ahead of former Athletics teammate Dan Coates. Small finished his first season with the Kodiaks with 13 goals and 35 points.

Professional career

Major League Lacrosse
After finishing his successful four-year tenure at the University of Albany, Small was drafted 22nd overall by the Toronto Nationals in the 2009 Major League Lacrosse Collegiate Draft.

National Lacrosse League
On September 9, 2009, Small was drafted 1st round, 9th overall in the 2009 NLL entry draft by the Edmonton Rush. After missing the 2014 season due to injury, Small returned to the Rush in 2015 but was traded to the Vancouver Stealth shortly into the season.

Statistics

NCAA

MLL

References

External links
 Bio from University of Albany web site

1987 births
Living people
Albany Great Danes men's lacrosse players
Canadian expatriate lacrosse people in the United States
Canadian lacrosse players
Edmonton Rush players
Vancouver Warriors players
Lacrosse people from Ontario
Major League Lacrosse players
Sportspeople from St. Catharines
Hamilton Nationals players